Founded by Larry Bagneris jr in 1979

The Houston Gay Pride Parade (or often called the Houston Pride Parade)  is the major feature of a gay pride festival held annually since 1979. The festival takes place in June to celebrate the lesbian, gay, bisexual, and transgender people and their allies. This event commemorates the 1969 police raid of the Stonewall Inn on Christopher Street in New York City's Greenwich Village neighborhood, which is generally considered to be the beginning of the modern gay rights movement.

The festivities are held all day on the 4th Saturday of June.  The highlight of the event is the parade, which has been held in the evening after sunset since 1997. The necessary revision in a Houston parade ordinance to allow a nighttime parade was facilitated by then-Houston City Council member Annise Parker. With the event after dark, the various units can be creatively illuminated.
 
Until 2015, it took place in Houston's most gay-friendly neighborhood, Montrose.  The route of the parade usually had been along Westheimer Road, from Dunlavy Street to Crocker Street. Owing partially to concerns over increasing congestion over the years in the nearby neighborhoods, and to accommodate a larger festival (held in the daytime before the parade itself), the 2015 parade was moved to downtown Houston.

It is currently the most attended and largest gay pride event in Texas, the Southwest region of the United States, and the second largest Houston-organized event in the city behind Houston Rodeo. The 2015 Houston Pride Festival attracted 700,000 attendees, which set a new record.

The Houston Pride parade was expected to take place in the fall for the first time in 2020 due to the COVID-19 pandemic., however due to the increasing cases in Houston the 2020 Pride Parade became replaced with a virtual rally. It was the first and only time the parade was cancelled.

Awards 
Entries in the parade are eligible for awards in categories with cultural references significant to LGBT history as well as a judges pick and categories with more localized focus:

 Judges' Choice
 Aria (best creative sound)
 Fabulous (best costumes)
 Rainbow (best lighting)
 Ruby Slipper (best walking)
 Judy Garland (best performance)
 Pink Diamond (best float by a for-profit company)
 Priscilla (best float by a non-profit group)
 Spirit of Montrose (best overall)

Houston Pride Themes & Parade Grand Marshals

See also

LGBT culture in Houston

References

External links
Pride Houston Website
InterPride

Gay Pride calendar

1979 establishments in Texas
Annual events in Texas
Festivals in Houston
LGBT culture in Houston
Pride parades in Texas
Festivals established in 1979